The 1915 Svenska Mästerskapet Final was played on 17 October 1915 between the seventh-time finalists Djurgårdens IF and the fourteenth-time finalists Örgryte IS. The match decided the winner of 1915 Svenska Mästerskapet, the football cup to determine the Swedish champions. Djurgårdens IF won their second title with a 4–1 victory at Stockholm Olympic Stadium in Stockholm.

Route to the final

Djurgårdens IF 

Djurgårdens IF entered in the first qualifying round against IF Swithiod on 30 June 1915 and won, 5–0, at home in Stockholm. On 18 July 1915, Djurgården played IK Sirius at home in the second qualifying round and won, 2–0. In the preliminary round, Djurgården beat IFK Stockholm 7–0, at home on 8 August 1915. For the quarter-final, Djurgården was drawn against Helsingborgs IF, and played a goalless draw on 5 September 1915 at home, resulting in an away-game replay on 12 September 1915 in Helsingborg, who again ended in a draw, this time 2–2, and a second replay at home on 26 September 1915, ending in 2–1 win for Djurgården. On 3 October 1915, Djurgården won against AIK at home in the semi-final with 2–1.

Djurgårdens IF made their seventh appearance in a Svenska Mästerskapet final, having won one, against final opponents Örgryte IS in 1912, and lost five, including four to final opponents Örgryte, in 1904, 1906, 1909 and 1913.

Örgryte IS 

Örgryte IS entered the tournament in the preliminary round with a 3–1 away-game win against IS Halmia of Halmstad on 8 August 1915. On 5 September 1915, Örgryte IS beat Westermalms IF, 5–1, in the quarter-final at home in Gothenburg. In the semi-final, Örgryte IS was drawn against IFK Eskilstuna and won 4–0 at home on 3 October 1915.

Örgryte made their fourteenth appearance in a Svenska Mästerskapet final, having won 13, including four against final opponents Djurgården in 1904, 1906, 1909 and 1913, and lost two, including the previous final to Djurgården.

Match details

References 

Print

1915
Örgryte IS matches
Djurgårdens IF Fotboll matches
Football in Stockholm
October 1915 sports events
Sports competitions in Stockholm
1910s in Stockholm